A Night of Appreciation  was a professional wrestling benefit show held to raise funds for American professional wrestler Terry "Sabu" Brunk, who had incurred costly medical bills while hospitalized for several months after contracting a mysterious virus that at one point left him temporarily paralyzed. The event took place on December 12, 2004 in the Diamondback Saloon in Belleville, Michigan, and was organized by Canadian professional wrestling promoter Scott D'Amore, veteran professional wrestling manager Jimmy Hart and Raven, a close friend of Sabu.

Event
The event was attended by approximately 700 people, with some turned away due to insufficient capacity. Tickets were priced at $15 for adults and $10 for children, with VIP tickets (entailing select seating and access to an autograph session) priced at $30. The event was later released on DVD.

The Master of Ceremonies was Jimmy Hart, and the ring announcer was "Irish" Bobby Clancy. The matches featured wrestlers from D'Amore's Windsor, Ontario-based Border City Wrestling (BCW) promotion, wrestlers from Total Nonstop Action Wrestling (TNA), where Sabu was employed before being hospitalized, and friends of Sabu such as the Insane Clown Posse and fellow Extreme Championship Wrestling alumni Shane Douglas, Raven and Mick Foley.

Every performer worked for free and paid their own travel costs, while the building used, the lighting and sound equipment and the ring itself were all provided without charge. In addition, several wrestlers and fans donated items that were subsequently auctioned or raffled, including a World Championship Wrestling t-shirt signed by Scott Hall and Kevin Nash, and a two by four signed by Jim Duggan.

The proceeds of the event were given entirely to Sabu, who went on to make a complete recovery, and returned to the ring on May 21, 2005.

Results

References

Professional wrestling shows
Events in Michigan
2004 in professional wrestling
2004 in Michigan
Professional wrestling in Michigan